KŚ AZS Wrocław was a women's football team based in Wrocław, Poland. The football team was officially a part of the Wrocław University of Science and Technology's sporting section, called AZS-AWF Wrocław (founded in 1976). The ladies football club section of AZS-AWF Wrocław was founded in 1997 and quickly became a dominant force in women's football in Poland. During their 23 years as a club they won the Polish Championship eight times, with all eight titles being won consecutively from 2001–2008. They also finished second twice and finished third four times. As a club they didn't finish outside of the top three between 2000–2011. AZS Wrocław have also had success in the Polish Cup, winning the competition four times. On 13 May 2020 it was announced that AZS Wrocław had reached an agreement with Śląsk Wrocław with the Śląsk Wrocław ladies team taking AZS Wrocław's place in the Ekstraliga.

Club names
 Klub Środowiskowy Akademickiego Związku Sportowego Wrocław (1997–2006)
 Akademickiego Związku Sportowego Volksbank Leasing Wrocław (2006–2007)
 Klub Środowiskowy Akademickiego Związku Sportowego Wrocław (2007–2010)
 Klub Sportowy Akademicki Związek Sportowy Wrocław (2010–2020)

Honours
Ekstraliga
Winners (8): 2000–01, 2001–02, 2002–03, 2003–04, 2004–05, 2005–06, 2006–07, 2007–08
Runners–up (2): 1999–2000, 2008–09
Third place (4): 1997–98, 2009–10, 2010–11, 2013–14

Polish Cup
Winners (4): 2002–03, 2003–04, 2006–07, 2008–09
Runners–up (3): 2001–02, 2005–06, 2013–14

Seasons

UEFA Competitions Record

Final squad

References

External links 
 Official Website

Women's football clubs in Poland
Football clubs in Wrocław
Association football clubs established in 1997
1997 establishments in Poland
Wrocław University of Science and Technology
2020 disestablishments in Poland
Association football clubs disestablished in 2020